Makara is a legendary sea-creature in Hindu culture.

It may also refer to:

 Makara (album), the third studio album released by E. S. Posthumus
 Makara (magazine), a Canadian feminist arts journal, 1975–1978
 Makara (month), in Indian solar calendar
 Makara, a month in the Darian calendar
 Makara (short story), a Sri Lankan short story

Geography

New Zealand
 Mākara, a rural locality on the coast of the North Island west of Wellington
 Makara River (Chatham Islands), in the Chatham Islands
 Mākara River (Wellington), part of the Ruamahanga River system
 Makara Guardians, a group opposed to wind-farm development at Mākara

People
 Oleg Makara (born 1954), Slovak film director and scriptwriter

Entertainment 
Gamzee and Kurloz Makara, two characters from the webcomic Homestuck (2009-2016)

See also
 Makara (surname)
 Macarius, a given name
 Makara River (disambiguation)
 Makar (disambiguation)
 Mağara (disambiguation)